Norris Hulbert "Norrie" Hoyt Jr. (July 23, 1935 – August 4, 2013) was an American politician.

Born in Chicago, Illinois, he grew up in Arlington, Massachusetts. He graduated from Amherst College and received his law degree from Harvard Law School. Hoyt also received his master's degree from Boston University. In 1968, he moved to Vermont serving as deputy commissioner of taxation. He served in the Vermont House of Representatives 1974-1985 as a Democrat. In 1985, he became commissioner of the department of taxation and later commissioner of liquor control. He practice law in Norwich, Vermont moving there in 1970. He died in Norwich, Vermont.

Notes

1935 births
2013 deaths
Politicians from Chicago
People from Arlington, Massachusetts
People from Norwich, Vermont
Amherst College alumni
Boston University alumni
Harvard Law School alumni
Vermont lawyers
Democratic Party members of the Vermont House of Representatives
20th-century American lawyers